Alyn Edward Smith (born 15 September 1973) is a Scottish politician. A member of the Scottish National Party (SNP), he was elected as the Member of Parliament (MP) for Stirling at the 2019 general election. He also served as a Member of the European Parliament (MEP) for Scotland from 2004 to 2019. He has been serving as SNP Spokesperson for Europe and EU Accession since December 2022.

Early life and education
Smith was born in Glasgow on 15 September 1973 to Jane and Edward Smith. He grew up between Scotland and Saudi Arabia.

After returning to the UK in 1986, he studied law and European law at the University of Leeds, receiving his LLB (Hons) degree in 1994. He spent a year studying on the Erasmus Programme at the University of Heidelberg in Germany. He gained a master's degree in European studies from the College of Europe in Natolin, Warsaw in 1995. The following year, he graduated from Nottingham Law School at Nottingham Trent University, and received a Diploma in Legal Practice. For a year he taught English in India and worked with Scotland Europa in Brussels.

Smith later moved to London, where he qualified as a lawyer with commercial solicitors law firm Clifford Chance, working with them from 1997 to 1999. He was with another solicitors firm, Anderson Strathern, from 2000 to 2002. Smith was a director of Turning Point Scotland from 2011 to 2015, and a trustee of LGBT Youth Scotland from 2012 to 2017. He is Honorary Vice President of the Scottish Society for the Prevention of Cruelty to Animals (SSPCA).

Political career

European Parliament
Smith was elected for the first time – as Scotland's youngest MEP – in the 2004 European Parliament election. He was re-elected three times at the 2009, 2014 and 2019 European Parliament elections. He sat as a member of the currently seven-strong European Free Alliance Group in the Parliament, which retains its own identity within the joint Green-European Free Alliance Group.

He was a member of the SNP's National Executive Committee until he was voted out in November 2020.

In his first two terms in the European Parliament, Smith served as a full member of the Committee on Agriculture and Rural Development winning the coveted Scottish Farmer Magazine award for "Outstanding Contribution to Scottish Agriculture" at the Highland Show in 2009.

After his re-election in 2014, Smith served as a full member of the Foreign Affairs Committee, remaining a voice in agriculture as alternate member of the Agriculture and Rural Development Committee. He was also a full member of both the Delegation for relations with the Arabian Peninsula, and the Delegation for relations with Iraq.

On 27 March 2019, in a brief speech to the European parliament, Smith stated that Brexit will cause the people of Scotland to be removed from the EU against their democratically expressed will, and that Scottish independence from the UK could provide a means for Scotland to rejoin the EU. Many newspaper headlines cited his closing line: "I'm asking you to leave a light on so we can find our way home."

On Sky News in May 2019, Smith claimed that the Brexit Party is "a shell company that’s a money laundering front". After the party's chairman threatened legal action, Smith apologised unreservedly and admitted that he had no evidence for his allegation, made a major contribution to the party chairman's legal costs and made a donation to charity. It is alleged that Smith's donation was paid by the SNP out of member's party donations.

All new EU accession states must commit to joining the euro as a condition of membership and in May 2019 Smith said that Scotland should be "open" to joining the euro if ever the country leaves the United Kingdom.  In 2021 Smith said an independent Scotland should hold a referendum on the issue. “We would want to participate an economic & monetary union for the macroeconomic stability," Smith told La Repubblica. "The adoption of the euro should be put to the people in a referendum." He also accepted that the SNP's proposals would mean a hard border with England: "The border of Carlisle will be an external border of the European Union, customs union and single market. We've got obligations of policing that, of course."

After the election, Smith became President of the European Free Alliance group in the European Parliament, and by holding that office, First Vice-President of the Greens/EFA Group.

House of Commons
He contested Edinburgh West for the SNP at the 2001 general election, coming fourth. At the 2003 Scottish Parliament election, he contested the same seat, again coming fourth. Smith was Group Advisor for Justice, Business and Europe for the SNP Group in the Scottish Parliament from 2002 to 2004.

On 12 December 2019, Smith was elected as the Member of Parliament (MP) for Stirling, unseating the previous Conservative Party incumbent Stephen Kerr with a majority of 9,254 votes or 17.6%. Following his election, Smith ceased to be an MEP, as an individual cannot simultaneously be a member of a member state's legislature and of the European Parliament.

In July 2022 Smith rejected Labour calls for a General Election on the grounds that "I... just enjoy what’s going on in the UK Government right now because it’s actually strengthening our case that Westminster doesn’t work."

Personal life
On 4 May 2022 Smith announced that he had become engaged to his boyfriend of nine years, Jonathon Ramsay

References

External links
Official website

Alyn Smith MEP SNP website
Alyn Smith MEP European Parliament website
The Greens/European Free Alliance Group

1973 births
Living people
Alumni of the University of Leeds
Alumni of Nottingham Trent University
Politicians from Glasgow
College of Europe alumni
Scottish National Party MEPs
MEPs for Scotland 2004–2009
MEPs for Scotland 2009–2014
MEPs for Scotland 2014–2019
MEPs for Scotland 2019–2020
UK MPs 2019–present
Scottish LGBT politicians
Heidelberg University alumni
Scottish solicitors
Gay politicians
LGBT MEPs for the United Kingdom
Scottish National Party MPs
People educated at Hutchesons' Grammar School
Alumni of the Erasmus Programme
21st-century LGBT people